Schnappi und seine Freunde ("Schnappi and his friends") is the debut album of animated German crocodile, Schnappi and was released in 2004.

Track listing
 "Schnappi, das kleine Krokodil" (2:09)
 "Mahlzeit" (2:25)
 "Ein Pinguin" (2:12)
 "Ein Lama in Yokohama" - by Schnappi und das Lama (2:02)
 "Känguru" (4:01)
 "Sieben Hummeln" (2:11)
 "Ri-Ra-Rad" (2:30)
 "Krötenkäpt'n" (2:04)
 "Teddybärtanz" (2:48)
 "Hase Moppel"	(2:16)
 "Das kleine Nilpferd"	(1:56)
 "Abends am Nil" (4:54)
 "Schnappi" (Karaoke Version) (2:09)
 "Mahlzeit" (Karaoke Version) (2:25)
 "Ein Lama in Yokohama" - by Schnappi und das Lama (Karaoke Version) (2:02)
 "Krötenkäpt'n" (Karaoke Version) (2:04)
 "Das kleine Nilpferd" (Karaoke Version) (1:56)
+
 "Schnappi" (Videos)
 Liedtexte

Charts

References

2005 debut albums
Schnappi albums